Hannah Kelly (born 20 December 2000) is a British track and field athlete.

Early life
From Bury, Kelly attended the Holy Cross College. She joined the Bolton Harriers running club when she was eleven. She studied Law at the University of Birmingham.

Career
Kelly qualified for the semi-finals in the 200 metres on her senior debut, aged 17 years-old, at the 2018 British Indoor Athletics Championships in Birmingham. That year she won the silver medal in the event at the English Under-20s Indoor Championships.

After stepping up to 400 metres Kelly became the English U23 champion in 2021, in only her fourth outdoor race over the distance.

She had success defending this title in 2022. Kelly made her international debut in February after being selected for the England team for the mixed 4x400 m relay team competing at the Dynamic New Athlete indoor event in Glasgow.

She was selected for the Great Britain squad at the 2023 European Indoor Championships held in Istanbul as part of the 4x400 m relay team.

References

External links

2000 births
Living people
English female sprinters
Sportspeople from Bury, Greater Manchester
British female athletes